Like I'm a Warrior is the 2014 debut album of the Norwegian singer-songwriter Emilie Nicolas released on Sony Music.

Background 
Like I'm a Warrior won  Best Pop Singer and Best Newcomer at the 2014 Spellemannprisen. Nicolas headlined the Øya Festival in Oslo 2015, and also appeared at the 2015 Moldejazz international festival.

Reception 

Like I'm a Warrior reached number 1 on VG-lista, the official Norwegian Albums Chart. 
The reviewer Robert Hoftun Gjestad of the Norwegian newspaper Aftenposten awarded the album grade 6, the reviewer Torgrim Øyre of the Norwegian newspaper Dagbladet awarded the album dice 6, the Verdens Gang review awarded the album dice 5, the reviewer Torstein Davidsen of the Norwegian newspaper Romerikes Blad awarded the album dice 6, and the reviewer Brand Barstein of the Scandinavian website Gaffa.com awarded the album 6 stars.

Track list

Charts

Certifications

References

External links 

Spellemannprisen winners
2014 albums